Stagnaro is a surname of Italian origin which means "pewterer." Notable people with the surname include:

Andrés Stagnaro (born 1907), Argentine footballer
Bruno Stagnaro (born 1973), Argentine film and television director, producer and screenplay writer
Ramón Stagnaro, Peruvian guitarist
Raúl Castro Stagnaro, Peruvian politician

References

Surnames of Italian origin